Frank Siebeck (born 17 August 1949 in Schkeuditz) is a retired hurdler who represented East Germany. He competed for SC Leipzig.

Achievements

External links 
 
 
 

1949 births
Living people
East German male hurdlers
Athletes (track and field) at the 1972 Summer Olympics
Athletes (track and field) at the 1976 Summer Olympics
Olympic athletes of East Germany
European Athletics Championships medalists
People from Schkeuditz
Sportspeople from Saxony